Anne Healey (born January 2, 1951) is an American politician. She is a member of the Maryland House of Delegates, representing District 22 in Prince George's County since 1991. She previously served on the City Council in Hyattsville, Maryland from 1987 to 1990.

Early life and education
Healey was born in Scranton, Pennsylvania on January 2, 1951. She graduated from Cathedral High School, and later attended Marywood College, where she earned a B.A. degree in 1972, and the Catholic University of America, where she earned a M.A. degree in 1974.

Career
After graduating, Healey became a newspaper writer and editor for various Maryland-based newspapers, including The Catholic Review, The Prince George's Sentinel, and The Prince George's Post.

Healey first got involved with politics in grade school after attending a campaign parade for then-presidential candidate John F. Kennedy. After a 15-year long career in journalism, Healey decided to pursue a career in politics. From 1987 to 1990, Healey served on the Hyattsville City Council. Afterwards, she ran for state delegate in District 22, winning the Democratic primary with 18 percent of the vote and the general election with 24 percent of the vote.

In the legislature
Healey was sworn into the Maryland House of Delegates on January 9, 1991. She is the House Chair of the House Rules & Executive Nominations Committee and a member of the Environmental Matters Committee and its housing & real property and motor vehicle & transportation subcommittees.

Committee assignments
 Chair, Rules and Executive Nominations Committee, 2013–present (member, 1998–2006)
 Member, Environment and Transportation Committee, 2015–present (housing & real property subcommittee, 2015–present; motor vehicle & transportation subcommittee, 2017–present; chair, local government & bi-county agencies subcommittee, 2015–present)
 Member, Joint Subcommittee on Program Open Space and Agricultural Land Preservation, 2019–present
 Member, Joint Expenditure Study Group on Law Enforcement and Transportation, 1991
 Member, Joint Study Group on Transportation and Lottery Revenues, 1991
 Member, Ways and Means Committee, 1991–2006 (vice-chair, 1997–2006; chair, vice-chair's subcommittee, 1997–2006)
 Member, House Chair, Task Force on Telecommunications Taxes, 1994
 Member, Special Joint Committee on Competitive Taxation and Economic Development, 1996–1997
 House Chair, Task Force to Study County Property-Tax Setoffs and Related Fiscal Issues, 1997
 Member, Joint Committee on Children, Youth, and Families, 1999–2003
 Member, Special Committee on Higher Education Affordability and Accessibility, 2003–2004
 Member, Spending Affordability Committee, 2003–2007
 Member, House Chair, Joint Committee on Administrative, Executive and Legislative Review, 2007–2012
 Member, Environmental Matters Committee, 2007–2015 (ground rent work group, 2007; housing & real property subcommittee, 2007–2015; motor vehicle & transportation subcommittee, 2007–2010; chair, local government & bi-county subcommittee, 2007–2015)

Other memberships
 Member, County Affairs Committee, Prince George's County Delegation, 2015–present (bi-county committee, 1991–2002, 2008–2014; law enforcement & state-appointed boards committee, 2003–2007; maryland-national capital park & planning commission committee, 2008–2012)
 President, Women Legislators of Maryland, 2021–present (member, 1991–present; legislative committee, 2006; secretary, 2016–2018; 2nd vice-president, 2018–2019; 1st vice-president, 2018–2019; vice-president, 2020–2021)
 Member, Maryland Bicycle and Pedestrian Caucus, 2004–present
 Member, Maryland Veterans Caucus, 2005–present
 Member, Maryland Legislative Latino Caucus, 2015, 2019–present
 Member, Maryland Legislative Transit Caucus, 2019–present
 Member, National Conference of State Legislatures (budgets & revenue committee, 2005–present)

Personal life
While reporting for The Catholic Review, Healey met her future husband, Neal Conway. Together, they have lived in Hyattsville since 1979 and have raised two children. Healey is a devout Catholic and is of Irish descent. In September 2015, she was invited to attend Pope Francis's visit to the White House.

In June 2020, Healey was diagnosed with breast cancer. Her chemotherapy treatments ended in December and she continued to receive radiation treatment during the 2021 legislative session.

Political positions

Education
Healey introduced legislation during the 2013 legislative session that would make the Maryland school year start after Labor Day. The bill passed to form a task force investigating a post-Labor Day start, of which Healey was a member. In 2019, Healey voted for, and later voted to override the governor's veto on, a bill that would allow school districts to start before Labor Day.

Environment
In 2015, Healey introduced legislation to protect bees from neonics. The bill passed and became law on May 28, 2016.

In 2017, Healey sponsored legislation that would require developers to replant an acre of trees for every acre of forest they clear. Healey introduced legislation during the 2018 legislative session that would create a state definition for priority forests to improve state conservation laws. In 2019, Healey introduced legislation to create a task force to monitor and address future deforestation and make recommendations to prevent forest loss without disrupting growth and development.

Health care
In 2004, Healey voted in favor of legislation that would levy a two-percent tax on health maintenance organizations to keep medical malpractice insurance costs for doctors in check.

In 2006, Healey voted in favor of legislation that would require Walmart to pay more for employee health care benefits. The bill was vetoed by Governor Bob Ehrlich, and the legislature failed to override his veto on an 88-50 vote in the House and a 30-17 vote in the Senate.

In 2019, Healey voted in favor of legislation that would create a five-person panel to investigate and negotiate the prices of high-priced drugs.

Immigration
In 2021, Healey voted in favor of legislation that would prohibit state and local government agencies from providing records or data to U.S. Immigration and Customs Enforcement for the purpose of civil immigration enforcement.

National politics
During the 2016 presidential primaries, Healey endorsed Martin O'Malley. In 2020, she endorsed Joe Biden.

Social issues
In 2001, Healey voted in favor of legislation that would ban discrimination based on sexual orientation. In 2006, she opposed legislation that would ban gay marriage in Maryland. The bill failed to pass out of the House of Delegates on a 61-78 vote.

Healey opposes the death penalty. In 2013, she voted in favor of legislation to repeal the death penalty, which was signed into law by Governor Martin O'Malley.

In 2003, Healey supported a proposal that would strip funding for abortion from the state budget. In 2005, she voted against a bill to provide state funding toward embryonic stem cell research. In 2022, Healey voted against the Abortion Care Access Act, a bill to expand the array of medical providers who could perform abortions. She also voted against overriding the gubernatorial veto on the bill.

Taxes
In 2013, Healey voted in favor of legislation to raise the state's fuel tax to replenish the state's transportation fund. In 2015, Healey voted against legislation that would repeal Maryland's "Rain Tax".

Electoral history

References

Democratic Party members of the Maryland House of Delegates
1951 births
Living people
Women state legislators in Maryland
21st-century American politicians
21st-century American women politicians
20th-century American politicians
20th-century American women politicians